#blackAF is an American sitcom created by Kenya Barris. It premiered on Netflix on April 17, 2020. The title derives from Internet slang, where "AF" is a term of emphasis, meaning "as fuck".  In June 2020, the series was renewed for a second season. A year later, the renewal decision was reversed and the series was canceled after one season.

Premise
The series stars Barris as a fictionalized version of himself. The official synopsis reads: "#blackAF uncovers the messy, unfiltered, and often hilarious world of what it means to be a 'new money' black family trying to 'get it right' in a modern world where 'right' is no longer a fixed concept."

Cast

Main

 Rashida Jones as Joya Barris
 Kenya Barris as Kenya Barris
 Iman Benson as Drea Barris
 Genneya Walton as Chloe Barris
 Scarlet Spencer as Izzy Barris
 Justin Claiborne as Pops Barris
 Ravi Cabot-Conyers as Kam Barris

Recurring
 Richard Gardenhire Jr. as Brooklyn Barris
 Gil Ozeri as Danny
 Bumper Robinson as Broadway
 Nia Long as Lavette
 Angela Kinsey as Leeza
 Doug Hall as Marquise

Ava DuVernay, Will Packer, Tyler Perry, Issa Rae, Tim Story, Scooter Braun, Lena Waithe, Jay Rock and Steven Levitan made appearances as themselves in the series.

Episodes

Production

Development
Netflix ordered #blackAF (originally titled Black Excellence) as the first series under Barris' deal with them. Announcing the production of the show, Netflix said, "Inspired by Barris' irreverent, highly flawed, unbelievably honest approach to parenting, relationships, race, and culture, Black Excellence looks to pull the curtain back and reboot the 'family sitcom' in a way we've never seen before." On June 23, 2020, Netflix renewed the series for a second season. A year later, on June 23, 2021, the renewal decision was reversed and the series was canceled after one season, but may return as a standalone film franchise.

Casting
On May 10, 2019, Kenya Barris and Rashida Jones were cast in starring roles. On December 20, 2019, Genneya Walton, Iman Benson, Scarlet Spencer, Justin Claiborn, Ravi Cabot-Conyers, and Richard Gardenhire Jr. were announced as additional cast members.

Reception
On Rotten Tomatoes, the series has an approval rating of 46% based on 24 reviews, with an average rating of 6.97/10. The website's critical consensus states: "Solid one-liners and some sharp social critiques can't save #blackaf from feeling more like a stale retread than a fresh step forward for creator Kenya Barris." On Metacritic, it has a weighted average score of 61 out of 100, based on 18 critics, indicating "generally favorable reviews".

References

External links
 
 

2020 American television series debuts
2020 American television series endings
2020s American black sitcoms
2020s American single-camera sitcoms
English-language Netflix original programming
Television series about families
Works about race and ethnicity